Drumcliff or Drumcliffe is a village in County Sligo, Ireland. It is 8 km (5 miles) north of Sligo town on the N15 road on a low gravel ridge between the mountain of Ben Bulben and Drumcliff bay. It is on the Drumcliff river, originally called the "Codnach", which drains Glencar Lake. Drumcliff is the resting place of the Irish poet W. B. Yeats.

History

The old name of Drumcliff was Cnoc na Teagh (trans. Hill of the House). The village is one of several possible locations in Co. Sligo for the settlement of Nagnata as marked on Claudius Ptolemy's early map of Ireland. The name Codnach means placid or even tempered river. A battle was fought on this river in A.M. 3656 (1538 BC) by the legendary Milesian monarch Tigearnmas.

An ancient topographical poem in the Dinnsenchus (Lore of Places) tells how the baskets in the name refer to the wicker frames of a fleet of boats that was once made here. The poem is part of a lost epic story involving the Fomorians in a raid on an island in the western ocean.

Drumcliff formed the western extremity of the kingdom of Bréifne (the eastern end was Kells), and the northern extremity of Tir Fhiacrach Múaidhe (Tireragh).

The Battle of the Book took place near Drumcliff between 555 AD and 561 AD.

The historian Mac Firbisigh mention a "Fort of Codhnach", known to be a fort near Drumcliff, although its location now is unknown.

The Monastery

St. Colmcille founded a monastery in Drumcliff in about 575. The monastery was of such importance that it gave its name to the territory of Cairbre Drom Cliabh in which it resides. The first abbot was St. Mothorian.

The annals mention that in 1225, Amlaib Ó Beólláin, erenach of Drumcliff, a man eminent for generosity and for his guest-house, died this year. The Ó Beólláin family were hereditary keepers of Drumcliff monastery.

All that remains of the monastery now is an Irish High Cross dating to c. 1100, and a ruined 10th or 11th century round tower, the only one known in County Sligo, The round tower was struck by lightning in 1396. Further decorated cross slabs are built into the walls of the current church.

William Butler Yeats

Drumcliff is the final resting place of the poet W. B. Yeats (1865–1939), who is buried in the graveyard of St. Columba's Church of Ireland. Although Yeats died in Roquebrune-Cap-Martin, France in January 1939, his remains were brought home to Ireland by the Irish Naval Service and re-interred at Drumcliff in 1948 in the presence of a large number of local people and dignitaries which included the Minister for External Affairs, Éamon de Valera and Seán MacBride, who represented the Government. His famous epitaph, written in the poem "Under Ben Bulben", reads:

Yeats paternal great-grandfather was rector in Drumcliff, as John Butler Yeats remarked in a letter to his son William in 1913:

Gallery

See also
 List of towns and villages in Ireland

References 

Towns and villages in County Sligo